Fear Itself is the 1968 self-titled debut album by psychedelic blues-rock band Fear Itself. The album was produced by Tom Wilson. It was the only album to be released by the band before their breakup after the death of bassist Paul Album. The album features lead vocalist Ellen McIlwaine, who launched a solo career after the group disbanded.

The album was originally released on LP by Dot Records. It was re-released on CD in 2006 by World IN Sound under license from Geffen Records.

Track listing
Side One
Crawling Kingsnake (J.L.Hooker, B.Bassman)
Underground River (Ellen McIlwaine)
Bow'd Up (Ellen McIlwaine)
For Suki (Ellen McIlwaine)
In My Time Of Dying (Traditional arr. by Ellen McIlwaine)

Side Two
The Letter (W.C. Thompson)
Lazarus (Traditional arr. by Ellen McIlwaine)
Mossy Dream (Ellen McIlwaine)
Billy Gene (Ellen McIlwaine)
Born Under a Bad Sign (Booker T. Jones, William Bell)

External links
World in Sound
Fear Itself review at Progressive and Psychedelic Music
Fear Itself at The Vinyl Tourist
Fear Itself at Meditations.jp

References

1969 debut albums
Dot Records albums
World IN Sound albums
Fear Itself (band) albums
Albums produced by Tom Wilson (record producer)